Negro Lake may refer to the following:

 Negro Lake (Herkimer County, New York)
 Negro Lake (Fulton County, New York)